Al Kifl (also known as Kifl) is a town in southeastern Iraq on the Euphrates River, between Najaf and Al Hillah.  The population in and near the town is about 15,000. Kifl is the location of Al-Nukhailah Mosque, containing the tomb of Dhul-Kifl who is believed be the biblical prophet Ezekiel. A project to renovate the tomb and develop it as a tourist attraction has proven controversial. The town was once a significant Jewish pilgrimage site and home to a community of Iraqi Jews until the late 1940s.

See also 
Ezekiel's Tomb

Notes

External links
 Dhu'l Kifl Shrine, archnet.org
 Rare Pictures Of Ezekiel The Prophet By Kobi arami

Kifl
Kifl